Satoru Sasaki (born October 16, 1985) is a Japanese long-distance runner who specialises in marathon running.

Sasaki finished 3rd at the 2015 Fukuoka Marathon in 2:08:56, an IAAF Gold Label Road Race.  He was the highest finishing runner from Japan in this race.  He achieved this without being an invited runner for the race.  This finish earned him selection for the 2016 Olympics, where he finished 16th.

References

External links

1985 births
Living people
Japanese male long-distance runners
Japanese male marathon runners
Olympic male marathon runners
Olympic athletes of Japan
Athletics at the 2016 Summer Olympics
Japan Championships in Athletics winners